Edwin Maurice Solomons (1879 – 22 April 1964) was a prominent figure in Irish Jewry and international business. He was the first member of the Dublin stock exchange.

Personal life 
He was born in Dublin, Ireland to a prominent Jewish family, one of the oldest Jewish families in Ireland. The family moved to Ireland from England in 1824. Bethel Solomons was the son of Maurice Solomons (1832–1922), an optician whose practice is mentioned in James Joyce's novel Ulysses, His mother, Rosa Jacobs Solomons (1833–1926), was born in Hull in England.

Edwin's brother, Bethel Albert Herbert Solomons (27 February 1885 – 11 September 1965), was an Irish medical doctor and an international rugby player for Ireland and supporter of the 1916 Rising. His sister Estella Solomons (1882–1968) was a leading artist, and a member of Cumann na mBan during the 1916 Rising; she married poet and publisher Seamus O'Sullivan. His younger sister Sophie was a trained opera singer.

Solomons was a former president of the Dublin United Hebrew Congregations and of the Jewish Representative Council of Eire.

Career 
He traveled extensively in Latin America, mostly in oil-rich countries such as Mexico and Venezuela, promoting oil and commodities trade, along with Jewish cultural exchange.

References
 Encyclopedia Judaica, Second Edition, volume 19, p146
 Goodwin, Terry The Complete Who's Who of International Rugby (Blandford Press, England, 1987)
 Bethel Solomons player profile Scrum.com
 "ulys10.htm". Trentu.ca. Retrieved 12 January 2011.
 Jews in Twentieth-century Ireland, by Dermot Keogh
 Edmund van Esbeck: The Story of Irish Rugby, Stanly Paul, 1986. p. 253
 Bethal Solomons One Doctor in His Time, by Christopher Johnson, Marion Pitman Books (London 1956)
 Dr. Michael Solomons, Obituary, Irish Times, 1 December 2007
 "Jean Cooke: Painter of wit and subtlety". The Independent (independent.co.uk). 11 August 2008. Retrieved 5 January 2014.

External links
 Irish Jewish official website
 Edwin M. Solomons, a Leader of Irish Jewry, Dees in Dublin at 84
M. Solomons
  Bethel Solomons - played for Ireland ten times

1879 births
1964 deaths
Alumni of Trinity College Dublin
Irish Jews
Irish people of English-Jewish descent